South Korea competed at the 2016 Winter Youth Olympics in Lillehammer, Norway from 12 to 21 February 2016.

Medalists

Medalists in mixed NOCs events

Alpine skiing

Boys

Girls

Biathlon

Boys

Girls

Mixed

Bobsleigh

Cross-country skiing

Boys

Girls

Curling

Mixed team

Team
Hong Jun-yeong
Kim Ho-geon
Lee Ji-young
Oh Su-yun

Round Robin

Draw 1

Draw 2

Draw 3

Draw 4

Draw 5

Draw 6

Draw 7

Mixed doubles

Figure skating

Singles

Couples

Mixed NOC team trophy

Freestyle skiing

Halfpipe

Slopestyle

Ice hockey

Short track speed skating

Boys

Girls

Mixed team relay

Qualification Legend: FA=Final A (medal); FB=Final B (non-medal); FC=Final C (non-medal); FD=Final D (non-medal); SA/B=Semifinals A/B; SC/D=Semifinals C/D; ADV=Advanced to Next Round; PEN=Penalized

Skeleton

Snowboarding

Halfpipe

Slopestyle

Speed skating

Boys

Girls

Mixed team sprint

See also
South Korea at the 2016 Summer Olympics

References

2016 in South Korean sport
Nations at the 2016 Winter Youth Olympics
South Korea at the Youth Olympics